Héyuán (Hakka:Fò-Ngiàn) is a prefecture-level city of Guangdong province in the People's Republic of China. As of the 2020 census, its population was 2,837,686 whom 1,051,993 lived in the built-up (or metro) area made of Yuancheng urban District and Dongyuan County largely being urbanized. Zijin County itself is quickly being conurbated in the agglomeration. The majority of the people are Hakka.
The city includes many rainforests and the largest lake in Guangdong: Xinfengjiang Reservoir. The literal meaning of the city's name is "origin of the river". It has recently been officially titled as the "Hometown of the Dinosaur in China", due to the thousands of dinosaur egg fossils that have been unearthed in its vicinity.

Geography 
Heyuan is located in the north-east region of Guangdong, upper reach of Dong River at its confluence with the Xinfeng River. Its latitude spans 23° 10'–24° 50' N, and longitude 114° 13'–115° 35' E. It borders Huizhou to the south, Ganzhou (Jiangxi) to the north, Meizhou to the east and Shaoguan to the west. Heyuan is a regional hub that connects the coastal areas of Guangdong and the interior countryside.

Heyuan is rich in natural resources and fertile land. Many mineral deposits such as iron ore, tungsten, tin, fluorite are found in Heyuan.

Climate 
Heyuan has a monsoon-influenced humid subtropical climate (Köppen Cfa), with short, mild to warm winters, and long, hot, humid summers. Winter begins sunny and dry but becomes progressively wetter and cloudier. Autumn is sunny and dry. With monthly percent possible sunshine ranging from 23% in March to 55% in October and November, the city receives 1,842 hours of bright sunshine annually.

Geology 
The city's museum boasts the Guinness World Record for the largest collection of dinosaur eggs, with 10,008 individual samples as of 2004. Dinosaur skeletons and fossilized footprints have also been found nearby.

Findings 
A dinosaur egg fossil dated back to the Late Cretaceous was discovered by primary school student named Zhang Yangzhe while playing near the Dong River in 2019 in July. The boy's mother, Li Xiaofang, later contacted the Heyuan Dinosaur Museum members, and under their excavation guidance more than 10 dinosaur egg fossils each about 9 centimeters in diameter and dating back to 66 million years were revealed.

Language 
In the great majority of Heyuan areas, Hakka Chinese is in general use.

In the greater part of areas in the city, Dongyuan County, Lianping County, Heping County, Longchuan County etc., it belongs to the Yuezhong dialect group, while in Zijin County and part of Longchuan County, it belongs to the Yuetai dialect group.

Also, in some areas on the banks of the Dongjiang, Dongjiang Bendihua is in general use. Its classification is disputed between the Yuezhong division of Hakka and the Huihe division of Yue.

Administration 

Heyuan City administers Yuancheng District, Dongyuan County, Heping County, Longchuan County, Zijin County and Lianping County. Heyuan city and its districts have a population of 3.2194 million. The municipality seat is in Yuancheng District.

Economy 
Heyuan city is a major economic and transportation hub for the Beijing-Kowloon Railway and the Guangzhou-Meizhou-Shantou Railway which crosses the city. There is also a marshalling station at Longchuan, which is the biggest in southern China.

State Highway 105 and 205 run through the city.  Dong River which Heyuan City is located in plays an important strategic waterway which allows huge cargo ships to transport goods to Huizhou, Dongguan, and Guangzhou.

Heyuan city is the major producer of Chinese kiwi fruit dried mushrooms of Jiulian, garlic, Hakka brewed liquor, Xinfengjiang pure water and mineral water, bamboo mats, sweet tangerines, green tea, and pot culture.

Transport 
Heyuan is served by the Hong Kong-Beijing Jingjiu railway with two stations: Heyuan railway station and Longchuan railway station.

Attractions

Xinfengjiang Forest Park 

Heyuan City has a number of tourist attractions. There is a tall fountain located in Xinfengjiang forest park. There are scenic areas such as the Dagui Mountain and the first big artificial lake; Wanlu Lake and the Sujiawei Round House.

Longchuan County 
Longchuan county is home to scenic spots in Huoshan and Shuikeng.

Lianping 
The Neiguan Mountains and rivers are located in Lianping county.

Dongyuan County 
In Dongyuan county, there are scenic spots at Huanglong Crag and Zhangxi.

Sister cities 

 Kota Kinabalu, Sabah, Malaysia
 Tieling, Liaoning

References

External links 

 http://www.heyuan.gov.cn/ 
 The history of Heyuan

 
Prefecture-level divisions of Guangdong